The Cross Daggers is a Grade II listed former public house in Woodhouse, Sheffield, England.

The building features a date stone above the door which states that it was built in 1658 as well as the initials TGN, which is said to have stood for Thomas Godfrey Newbould, a prominent Quaker and landlord. The building overlooks the village stocks as well as the cross. Although it has largely been used as a public house since its completion, in more recent years it has been used to house various restaurants.

List of landlords
 Samuel Frith 
 John and Mary Staniforth (nee Hurt)  
 Robert Staniforth and Charlotte (nee Whitehead) c. 1880s

References

Buildings and structures completed in 1658
Grade II listed buildings in Sheffield
Grade II listed pubs in South Yorkshire
History of Sheffield
Houses completed in the 17th century